Optomux is a serial (RS-422/RS485) network protocol originally developed by Opto 22 in 1982 which is used for industrial automation applications. Optomux is an ASCII protocol consisting of command messages and response messages containing data from an Optomux unit & contain a message checksum to ensure secure communications. The serial data      link is very reliable,      over distances up to 4,000 feet and is suitable for extreme safety applications. An Optomux system is typically made up      of three main elements:

 There must be a host device to poll the Optomux brain boards.
 There are the brain boards themselves, anywhere from one to 255 of them.
 Each Optomux brain board attaches to an I/O mounting rack, carrying the individual I/O modules.

Limitation
The primary performance limitation of      the Optomux system is the slow serial data link. The maximum data rate supported by the Optomux      brain boards is 38.4 kbit/s (also dependent on the length of the communication      lines). In theory, at maximum speed, the Optomux      system should be capable of polling roughly      3,400 digital positions per second, or roughly      600 analog positions per second. This is      assuming that all the positions are on the      same brain board, which is not possible with      Optomux. A more realistic speed figure would      be about half of the previous numbers. For      faster serial data communication, Opto 22’s      Mistic protocol and hardware may be used      at speeds to 115.2 kbit/s. Or, a B3000 brain      using the Optomux protocol can communicate      at similar high speeds.

External links
 Optomux protocol user Guide
 Optomux Application FAQ

References

Industrial computing
Serial buses
Industrial automation